It Only Happens Every Time is a 1977 big band jazz album recorded by the Thad Jones/Mel Lewis Jazz Orchestra with singer Monica Zetterlund in Helsinki and Stockholm and released by EMI in Europe and by Inner City Records in the US.

Track listing
LP side A:
 "It Only Happens Every Time"
 "Long Daddy Green"
 "Silhouette"
 "He Was Too Good To Me"
LP side B:
 "The Groove Merchant"
 "Love To One Is One To Love"
 "Happy Again"
 "The Second Time Around"

Personnel
 Monica Zetterlund – vocals
 Thad Jones – flugelhorn 
 Mel Lewis – drums
 Harold Danko – piano 
 Rufus Reid – bass
 Jerry Dodgion – saxophone, flute
 Ed Xiques – saxophone, flute, clarinet
 Rich Perry – saxophone, flute, clarinet
 Dick Oatts – saxophone, flute, clarinet
 Pepper Adams – saxophone
 Frank Gordon – trumpet
 Earl Gardner – trumpet 
 Jeff Davis – trumpet
 Larry Moses – trumpet
 Earl McIntyre – trombone 
 John Mosca – trombone 
 Clifford Adams – trombone
 Billy Campbell – trombone

References

 Inner City IC1082

External links
 It Only Happens Every Time at: discogs.com

The Thad Jones/Mel Lewis Orchestra albums
1977 albums